In set theory, a prewellordering on a set  is a preorder  on  (a transitive and reflexive relation on ) that is strongly connected (meaning that any two points are comparable) and well-founded in the sense that the induced relation  defined by  is a well-founded relation.

Prewellordering on a set

A prewellordering on a set  is a homogeneous binary relation  on  that satisfies the following conditions:
Reflexivity:  for all  
Transitivity: if  and  then  for all 
for every non-empty subset  there exists some  such that  for all 

Examples

Given a set  the binary relation on the set  of all finite subsets of  defined by  if and only if  (where  denotes the set's cardinality) is a prewellordering.

Properties

If  is a prewellordering on  then the relation  defined by

A norm on a set  is a map from  into the ordinals.  Every norm induces a prewellordering; if  is a norm, the associated prewellordering is given by

Conversely, every prewellordering is induced by a unique regular norm (a norm  is regular if, for any  and any  there is  such that ).

Prewellordering property

 
 

 is said to have the prewellordering property if every set in  admits a -prewellordering.

The prewellordering property is related to the stronger scale property; in practice, many pointclasses having the prewellordering property also have the scale property, which allows drawing stronger conclusions.

Examples

 and  both have the prewellordering property; this is provable in ZFC alone.  Assuming sufficient large cardinals, for every   and 
have the prewellordering property.

Consequences

Reduction

If  is an adequate pointclass with the prewellordering property, then it also has the reduction property:  For any space  and any sets   and  both in  the union  may be partitioned into sets  both in  such that  and

Separation

For example,  has the prewellordering property, so  has the separation property.

See also

 
  – a graded poset is analogous to a prewellordering with a norm, replacing a map to the ordinals with a map to the natural numbers

References

  
  

Binary relations
Descriptive set theory
Order theory
Wellfoundedness